Brent Little (born April 3, 1983 in Poplar Bluff, Missouri) is a former American football wide receiver. He was signed by the Cleveland Browns as an undrafted free agent in 2006. He played college football at Southern Illinois.

Little has also been a member of the Kansas City Chiefs and Minnesota Vikings.

External links
Southern Illinois Salukis bio

1983 births
Living people
People from Poplar Bluff, Missouri
American football wide receivers
Southern Illinois Salukis football players
Cleveland Browns players
Kansas City Chiefs players
Minnesota Vikings players
Sioux Falls Storm players